Midnight Bourbon (January 25, 2018 – April 17, 2022) was an  American Thoroughbred racehorse who won the 2021 Lecomte Stakes and came second in the 2021 Preakness Stakes and Travers Stakes and 2022 Saudi Cup.

Midnight Bourbon died suddenly from an "acute gastrointestinal situation" on April 17, 2022.

Background
Midnight Bourbon was a dark bay colt born in Kentucky.  He was trained by Steve Asmussen and was ridden in his most recent start by jockey Paco Lopez.

According to David Fiske the general manager of the horse's owner Ron Winchell's "Ron Winchell's Thoroughbreds" the horse's name came about as follows ..."It was pretty much a stream-of-consciousness thing” .... “Ron and his buddies do like to try out all the new (bourbon) batches, and he also deals with a lot of liquor distributors. So liquor is in the forefront of his mind a lot, with business and pleasure. So it just came together.” The “Midnight” part of the name can be tied to the dam, Catch the Moon."

Racing career

2020: Two-Year-Old Season
Midnight Bourbon came third in his debut, a maiden special weight at Ellis Park on July 22. He broke his maiden in his second start, another maiden special weight at Ellis Park, on August 22.

Stepping up to stakes company, Midnight Bourbon came second in the Iroquois Stakes at Churchill Downs on September 5.

He then came third in the Champagne Stakes at Belmont Park on October 10.

2021: Three-Year-Old Season
Midnight Bourbon made his first start as a three-year-old on January 26, winning the Lecomte Stakes at Fair Grounds Racetrack.

He then placed in the next two races on the Derby trail at Fair Grounds, coming third in the Risen Star Stakes behind Mandaloun and second in the Louisiana Derby behind Hot Rod Charlie. The three races earnt him enough points on the 2021 Road to the Kentucky Derby to qualify for the 2021 Kentucky Derby.

Midnight Bourbon made his next start in the 2021 Kentucky Derby, and finished sixth after a bad trip.

His next start was in the Preakness Stakes, the second leg of the Triple Crown. He was sent off as the co-favorite with Kentucky Derby winner Medina Spirit at 5–2. Midnight Bourbon got a much better trip than in the Derby, running second most of the race behind Medina Spirit before passing him at the top of the stretch and looking to be the winner. However, Rombauer made a big move on the outside to win, with Midnight Bourbon finishing second.

Midnight Bourbon bypassed the third leg of the Triple Crown, the Belmont Stakes, to have some time off and target the big races in the summer.

He made his next start on July 17 in the Grade 1 Haskell Stakes at Monmouth Park Racetrack. He was full of running down the stretch but Hot Rod Charlie crossed over into his way and impeded his path, which caused Midnight Bourbon to throw his jockey Paco Lopez. Hot Rod Charlie crossed the finish line first was disqualified for his interference of Midnight Bourbon. Mandaloun, who had crossed second in a photo finish, was declared the official winner.

Midnight Bourbon came out of the Haskell unhurt and made his next start in the Grade 1 Travers Stakes at Saratoga Racecourse on August 28. He led the race through relaxed early fractions and then was challenged by Essential Quality at the top of the stretch. Midnight Bourbon fought back gamely and was only a head behind Essential Quality at the wire.

Midnight Bourbon followed up with a second in the Grade 1 Pennsylvania Derby on September 25 to Hot Rod Charlie and on his last start of year on 26 November  he finished third as a 6/5 favorite in the Grade 1 Clark Stakes at Churchill Downs to Maxfield.

2022: Four-Year-Old Season
Midnight Bourbon made his first start of 2022 in the Louisiana Stakes against his familiar rival Mandaloun, in which he came a close second only 3/4 of a length behind Mandaloun.

Midnight Bourbon prepared to make his next start in the $20 million Saudi Cup where he would face Mandaloun again as well as a quality field of international runners including the previous year's winner Mishriff.

"It's all there. It really is," his trainer Steve Asmussen said. "He has an elite level of talent without finishing it off. It leaves a lot for us moving forward. As accomplished as he is, or as lacking as his résumé is with the wins, he is still in a physical and mental development that I think allows for him to possibly end up being the best horse in training in the world this year. I am hoping beyond hope, and expect, that he's waiting for the Saudi Cup stage to put it all together perfectly."

Midnight Bourbon finished a close third in the race behind Emblem Road and Country Grammer, and jockey Joel Rosario said, "I thought he ran really well. It was probably a little bit different with him, but he showed heart. He did great."

Midnight Bourbon made his next start in the Dubai World Cup, where he finished fifth behind the winner Country Grammer.

Pedigree

References

2018 racehorse births
2022 racehorse deaths
Racehorses trained in the United States
Thoroughbred racehorses